Márk Farkas (born 13 January 1992) is a Hungarian football player who plays for Sényő FC.

Club statistics

Updated to games played as of 26 October 2014.

References

External links

HLSZ

1992 births
Living people
Sportspeople from Miskolc
Hungarian footballers
Association football defenders
Szombathelyi Haladás footballers
Gyirmót FC Győr players
Kisvárda FC players
Nyíregyháza Spartacus FC players
Nemzeti Bajnokság I players
Nemzeti Bajnokság II players